Woolgar is a rural locality in the Shire of Richmond, Queensland, Australia. In the  Woolgar had a population of 8 people.

History 

On 14 September 1881, Sub-inspector Henry Pollock Kaye of the Native Mounted Police, was responding to complaints from at the Woolgar gold fields townspeople of the First Nations persons stealing and other offences.  Together with other police and a native trooper, he mustered the indigenous persons to remove them from the area.  It was indicated there may have been up to 800 indigenous persons in the area, although only some thirty to forty to be removed.  Within fifteen minutes of Sub-inspector Nichols leaving to get other officers, Kaye was fatally speared by the persons.  A retaliatory massacre is believed to have occurred against the indigenous persons. 

Woolgar Upper Provisional School opened on 19 June 1901 and Woolgar Lower Provisional School opened on 24 June 1901, to work together as part-time schools (meaning a single teacher was shared between them). They closed in October 1903 but reopened in April 1904. Woolgar Lower Provisional School closed on 11 October 1906 while Woolgar Upper Provisional School continued as a full-time school and then closed circa 1912.

In the  Woolgar had a population of 8 people.

The Woolgar Valley Aboriginal Corporation had previously purchased Middle Park Station, 'to provide opportunities for the traditional owners of that area, the Woolgar people, who mostly live in Yarrabah, Hopevale and Townsville'.  The corporation was successful in legal action for compensation payable for renewal of a mining lease.

Geography
The Woolgar River rises in the north-east and flows through to the south-west. The stream known as Stawell River or Cambridge Creek flows through from east to west. The Dutton River forms part of the southern boundary.

Road infrastructure
The Richmond–Croydon Road crosses the north-western corner.

References 

Shire of Richmond
Localities in Queensland